Willis Winter Bradley Jr. (June 28, 1884 – August 27, 1954) was a Naval officer, a recipient of the Medal of Honor, Naval Governor of Guam, and a U.S. Representative from California.

Biography
Born in Ransomville, New York, Bradley moved with his parents to Milnor, North Dakota, in July 1884 and to Forman, North Dakota, in 1891. He attended the public schools, and Hamline University, St. Paul, Minnesota. He served as the deputy registrant of deeds of Sargent County, North Dakota, in 1902 and 1903.

Bradley graduated from the United States Naval Academy on September 12, 1906.

Career 
After two years at sea as a passed midshipman, he received his commission as an ensign on September 13, 1908.

While serving on the USS Culgoa, which was sent to aid survivors of the terrible 1908 Messina earthquake, he worked tirelessly to rescue survivors and clear bodies and debris from the scene. For his work, he later received a medal from the Pope. Next, he commanded  (Torpedo Boat No. 26) and the Reserve Torpedo Group at Annapolis, Md.

Beginning in September 1913, Bradley studied ordnance and explosives at the Naval Postgraduate School in Annapolis, Maryland, and then at George Washington University in Washington, D.C. He continued his studies at the Naval Proving Ground in Indian Head, Maryland, at Bausch & Lomb, and at the Midvale Steel Co. in Pittsburgh, Pa.

In that capacity, he received the Medal of Honor (World War I) for his actions on July 23, 1917, during a powder explosion in one of the ship's casemates. Though temporarily stunned, he entered the compartment, saved a man's life, and then reentered the casemate to extinguish burning gunpowder.

Bradley moved ashore again in January 1918 to head the Explosives, Fuses, and Primers Section of the Bureau of Ordnance. From there, he went to the Naval Torpedo Station in Keyport, Washington, in August 1919 to serve as a naval inspector. Returning to sea in June 1920, Bradley served as gunnery officer in  until May 1921. At that time, he reported to the Mare Island Navy Yard to assist in fitting out and commissioning . After the battleship went into commission on August 10, he served as her gunnery officer.

Bradley returned to Keyport in May 1922 for two years of duty at the Naval Torpedo Station as the Naval Inspector in Charge.

From July 1924 to November 1926, he commanded , the station ship at Guam in the Mariana Islands.

Between late 1926 and the middle of 1929, Bradley served in the Naval Reserve Section in the Bureau of Navigation.

Following that tour of duty, in June 1929, Bradley became a Naval Governor of Guam. As Governor, he issued Guam's first Bill of Rights, sought United States citizenship for the Chamorros and proclaimed them to be citizens of Guam, and reorganized the Guam Congress.  He also made possible the first free elections of village commissioners. He was considered a Progressive Republican and civil libertarian.

On April 8, 1930, he created the only official government-run local post called "Guam Guard Mail". It used overprinted Philippine stamps for the 1st, 3rd, and 4th issues and a locally printed one for the 2nd. It was needed since the U.S. Post Office did not deliver the mail to individual homes or businesses. "Guam Guard Mail" lasted one year forcing the Post Office to take over the operation on the northern half of Guam on January 1, 1931, and the southern half on April 9, 1931.

Two years later, he became Captain of the Yard at the Pearl Harbor Navy Yard.

That assignment lasted until June 1937 at which time he was reassigned to the Naval War College as a student. After a year of duty with the Pacific coast section of the Board of Inspection and Survey beginning in May 1938, Capt. Bradley commanded Destroyer Squadron (DesRon) 31, Battle Force, based in San Diego for a year. At the conclusion of that assignment, he resumed duty with the Board of Inspection and Survey on the west coast. He continued in that billet through the end of World War II and until his retirement on August 1, 1946.

Bradley was elected as a Republican to the Eightieth Congress (January 3, 1947 – January 3, 1949) from California's 18th congressional district. He served as assistant to the president of the Pacific Coast Steamship Co. from 1949 to 1952. He served as member of the California State Assembly from 1952 until his death.

Personal life 
On October 16, 1907, in Baltimore, Maryland, Bradley married Sue Worthington Cox.

On August 27, 1954, Bradley died in Santa Barbara, California. 
Bradley is interred at Fort Rosecrans National Cemetery in San Diego, California.

Legacy 
The , was named in his honor.

Medal of Honor citation
Rank and organization: Commander, U.S. Navy. Born: 28 June 1884, Ransomville, N.Y. Appointed from: North Dakota. 
Citation:

For extraordinary heroism and devotion to duty while serving on the U.S.S. Pittsburgh, at the time of an accidental explosion of ammunition on that vessel. On 23 July 1917, some saluting cartridge cases were being reloaded in the after casemate: through an accident an explosion occurred. Comdr. Bradley (then Lieutenant), who was about to enter the casemate, was blown back by the explosion and rendered momentarily unconscious, but while still dazed, crawled into the casemate to extinguish burning materials in dangerous proximity to a considerable amount of powder, thus preventing further explosions.

Namesakes
 was named in his honor.

See also

List of Medal of Honor recipients
 Bruce McCandless

References

External links 
 Retrieved on February 23, 2008
 Willis Winter Bradley, Jr. at ourcampaigns.com
 Willis Winter Bradley at findagrave.com

1884 births
1954 deaths
People from Porter, New York
Military personnel from New York (state)
Republican Party members of the California State Assembly
United States Navy Medal of Honor recipients
United States Navy officers
Governors of Guam
United States Navy personnel of World War II
Burials at Fort Rosecrans National Cemetery
United States Navy personnel of World War I
World War I recipients of the Medal of Honor
People from Sargent County, North Dakota
Hamline University alumni
Republican Party members of the United States House of Representatives from California
20th-century American politicians